Joseph Keene (April 3, 1839 – December 1, 1921) was an American soldier who fought in the American Civil War. Keene received his country's highest award for bravery during combat, the Medal of Honor. Keene's medal was won for his actions at the Battle of Fredericksburg in Virginia, where he voluntarily seized his regiments colors after several Color Bearers had been shot down and led his regiment in the charge on December 13, 1862. He was honored with the award on December 2, 1892.

Keene was born in England. He joined the 26th New York Infantry from Utica, New York in May 1861, and mustered out with this regiment after two years. He re-enlisted with the 3rd New York Heavy Artillery in June 1863, and mustered out with this regiment in July 1865. Keene was later buried in Whitesboro, New York.

Medal of Honor citation

See also
List of American Civil War Medal of Honor recipients: G–L

References

1839 births
1921 deaths
American Civil War recipients of the Medal of Honor
Burials in New York (state)
English-born Medal of Honor recipients
English emigrants to the United States
People from Oneida County, New York
People of New York (state) in the American Civil War
Union Army soldiers
United States Army Medal of Honor recipients